is a railway station in Miyako, Fukuoka Prefecture, Japan. It is on the Tagawa Line, operated by the Heisei Chikuhō Railway. Trains arrive roughly every 30 minutes.

Born in Miyako, Komiya is known as the model for the character of Sanshirō in Sōseki's novel of the same name.

External links
Higashi-Saigawa-Sanshirō Station (Heisei Chikuhō Railway website)

References

Railway stations in Fukuoka Prefecture
Railway stations in Japan opened in 1993
Heisei Chikuhō Railway Tagawa Line